Peter Blackburn may refer to:
 Peter Blackburn (bishop) (died 1616), Scottish scholar and prelate
 Peter Blackburn (MP) (1811–1870), British Conservative Party politician
 Peter Blackburn (badminton) (born 1968), Australian badminton player